The Lafayette Monument is a bronze equestrian statue of Gilbert du Motier, marquis de Lafayette, by Andrew O'Connor, Jr.

It is located on the northern edge of the South Park, at Mount Vernon Place, Baltimore, directly across a cobblestone circle from The Washington Monument. It was dedicated on September 6, 1924, with President Calvin Coolidge in attendance.

The inscription reads:
(Sculpture, front edge, proper left side:) 
ANDREW O'CONNOR
1924 
(Sculpture, rear proper left side:)
T. F. MCGANN & SONS CO FOUNDRY
BOSTON MASS 
(Base, front:) 

(Base, east side:) 

(Base, west side:) 
LA FAYETTE IMMORTAL
BECAUSE A SELF-FORGETFUL SERVANT OF
JUSTICE AND HUMANITY
BELOVED BY ALL AMERICANS
BECAUSE HE ACKNOWLEDGED NO DUTY MORE
SACRED THAN TO FIGHT FOR THE FREEDOM
OF HIS FELLOW-MEN.
WOODROW WILSON. 
signed Founder's mark appears.

See also
List of public art in Baltimore

References

External links

https://www.flickr.com/photos/wallyg/203406543/
http://virtualglobetrotting.com/map/lafayette-monument/
https://web.archive.org/web/20120320105049/http://monumentcity.net/2009/05/15/marquis-de-lafayette-monument-baltimore-md/
President Coolidge Attends Unveiling of Lafayette Statue - Ghosts of Baltimore blog

1924 establishments in Maryland
1924 sculptures
Bronze sculptures in Maryland
Outdoor sculptures in Baltimore
Equestrian statues in Maryland
Landmarks in Baltimore
Monuments and memorials in Maryland
Mount Vernon, Baltimore
Sculptures of men in Maryland
Tourist attractions in Baltimore